Karl (Carl) Schorn (16 October 1803, Düsseldorf – 7 October 1850, Munich) was a German painter and chess master.

He was a member of the Berlin Pleiades (the seven stars of German chess) in the first half of the 19th century.

References

1803 births
1850 deaths
German chess players
19th-century German painters
19th-century German male artists
German male painters
Artists from Düsseldorf
People from the Rhine Province
19th-century chess players